Ralph Michell (by 1523 – 1578), of Bodmin, Cornwall, was an English politician.

He was a Member (MP) of the Parliament of England for Bodmin in November 1554.

References

Year of birth unknown
1578 deaths
English MPs 1554–1555
People from Bodmin
Year of birth uncertain